The Petroleros de Cienfuegos (Cienfuegos Oilers) first participated in the Cuban Professional League championship during the 1926–27 season.  Although representing the south coast city of Cienfuegos, the team played their home games in Havana. Cienfuegos did not play in the 1927–28 season, contending again from 1928–29 through 1930–31. After eight long years of absence, Cienfuegos reappeared in the 1939–40 tournament. In the 1949–50 season, the team was renamed as the Elefantes de Cienfuegos (Cienfuegos Elephants). "The pace of the elephant is slow but crushing", exclaimed the slogan of the Cienfuegos franchise that contended until the 1960–61 season. Following the 1959 Cuban Revolution, political tensions rose with the Fidel Castro government. In March 1961, one month after the regular season ended, the new Cuban regime decreed the abolition of professional baseball in Cuba.

In 26 Championships in which Cienfuegos participated, the team won five league titles in 1929–30, 1945–46, 1955–56, 1959–60 and 1960–61, finishing second 6 times, third 7 times, and fourth 8 times, posting a 732–793 record for a .480 average. Cienfuegos also won the Caribbean Series in 1956 and 1960.

Some notable Cienfuegos players include George Altman, José Azcue, Gene Bearden, Cool Papa Bell, Bob Boyd, Leo Cárdenas, Sandalio Consuegra, Martín Dihigo, Tony González, Adolfo Luque, Sal Maglie, Seth Morehead, Ray Noble, Alejandro Oms, Camilo Pascual, Pedro Ramos, Cookie Rojas, Napoleón Reyes, Willie Wells, and Don Zimmer.

External links
Club Cienfuegos
Cuban Baseball Hall of Fame
Cuban Baseball Home
Hablemos de béisbol (Spanish)
Historia del club Cienfuegos (Spanish)
Sports online

Defunct baseball teams in Cuba
Cuban League teams